Lieutenant-General Sir Harry Edward de Robillard Wetherall,  (22 February 1889 – 18 November 1979) was an officer in the British Army during the First and Second World Wars.

Military career
Wetherall was commissioned into the Gloucestershire Regiment in 1909.

He served in the First World War in France and Belgium, becoming Commanding Officer of 2/4th Battalion Oxfordshire and Buckinghamshire Light Infantry in 1917. In March 1918 he was seriously wounded by a piece of shell in his neck.

After the war he became a lieutenant colonel in the Machine Gun Corps and then a General Staff Officer for Weapon Training in Scottish Command in 1930. He then served in Palestine where he was appointed Commanding Officer of 1st Battalion, York and Lancaster Regiment in 1936 and then Commander of 19th Brigade in 1938.

He served in the Second World War as General Officer Commanding 11th African Division in Abyssinia in 1941: he was part of the "Southern Front" for this campaign and commanded the Division during the advance from Kenya, through Italian Somaliland, and into Ethiopia. In late 1941, with the campaign all but over, the 11th African Division was disbanded and he became General Officer Commanding the East Africa Force. He was then appointed Commander-in-Chief, Ceylon in 1943.

After the war he became Commander-in-Chief, Ceylon at a time when the Sri Lankan independence struggle was ongoing; he retired in 1946.

References

Bibliography

External links
Generals of World War II

 

|-

 

1889 births
British Army lieutenant generals
1979 deaths
British Army generals of World War II
British Army personnel of World War I
British military personnel of the 1936–1939 Arab revolt in Palestine
Commander-in-Chief, Ceylon
Companions of the Distinguished Service Order
Companions of the Order of the Bath
Gloucestershire Regiment officers
Knights Commander of the Order of the British Empire
Military history of British Somaliland during World War II
Military history of Ceylon in World War II
Military personnel from London
People from Belgravia
Recipients of the Military Cross
York and Lancaster Regiment officers